Setar is an Iranian musical instrument.

Setar may also refer to:
 SETAR NV, a telecommunications service provider for Aruba
 SETAR (model), a statistical Self-Exciting Autoregressive model typically applied to time series data

See also
 Sitar (disambiguation)
 Satar (disambiguation)